is a national highway connecting Tokyo and Yokohama in Japan.

Route data
Length: 29.2 km (18.1 mi)
Origin: Nihonbashi, Chūō, Tokyo (originates at junction with Route 1, Route 4, Route 6, Route 14, Route 17 and Route 20)
Terminus: Yokohama (ends at Junction with Route 1)
Major cities: Kawasaki

History
4 December 1952 - First Class National Highway 15 (from Tokyo to Yokohama)
1 April 1965 - General National Highway 15 (from Tokyo to Yokohama)

Municipalities passed through
Tokyo
Chūō - Minato - Shinagawa - Ōta
Kanagawa Prefecture
Kawasaki (Kawasaki-ku, Kanagawa) - Yokohama (Tsurumi - Kanagawa)

Intersects with

Tokyo
Routes 1, 4, 6, 14, 17 and 20 at the origin
Route 130 at Minato-ku
Yashio Bypass, Route 357 at Shinagawa-ku
Route 131 at Ōta-ku
Kanagawa Prefecture
Routes 132 and 409 at Kawasaki-ku, Kawasaki
Route 1, at the terminus

References

015
Roads in Kanagawa Prefecture
Roads in Tokyo